The 1961–62 season was Stoke City's 55th season in the Football League and the 22nd in the Second Division.

Attendances were now at a worrying all-time low and so the Stoke board and manager Tony Waddington decided something needed to be done to bring the supporters back to the Victoria Ground. And Waddington pulled off a master stroke after paying £3,000 to Blackpool for the returning 46-year-old Stanley Matthews. Crowds instantly arrived in large numbers with Matthews first match back against Huddersfield Town more than 35,000 turned up a good 15,000 more than the last home match. Stoke could not sustain a push for promotion, but the feeling around the club had changed dramatically.

Season review

League
Attendances remained stubbornly poor as the 1961–62 season commenced, Stoke losing 2–1 at home to Rotherham United in front of 11,000 fans. The club's finances were seriously in question with the worrying decline in support. To regress the slide Stoke brought back Stanley Matthews at the age of 46 some 14 years after he left for Blackpool. It certainly had the desired effect as the crowds quickly returned and traffic jams stretched for miles on the day he made his second debut for Stoke City at the Victoria Ground against Huddersfield Town when 35,974 fans assembled to welcome back their hero and see him inspire Stoke to a 3–0 win, the attendance in Stoke's previous home match was just 8,409.

The resurgence was on as Stoke slowly but surely picked up some good results and climbed the table as they went on a seven match unbeaten run in December. Dennis Viollet a fine centre forward joined from Manchester United for a fee of £22,000. By March Stoke's form fell away and they ended the season in eighth spot but the feeling was that Stoke had renewed confidence for the future.

FA Cup
Stoke were drawn away at last season's winners Leicester City in the FA Cup. The match ended in a 1–1 draw but in the replay Stoke knocked out the "Foxes" 5–2 to set up a fourth round meeting with Blackburn Rovers. A crowd of 49,486 saw Rovers win 1–0 thanks to a controversial penalty, the referees decision enraged one Stoke supporter so much he started legal action against him.

League Cup
Stoke recorded their first victory in the League Cup at Roots Hall beating Southend United 1–0. In the next round they were easily beaten 4–1 at Charlton Athletic.

Final league table

Results

Stoke's score comes first

Legend

Football League Second Division

FA Cup

League Cup

Friendlies

Squad statistics

References

Stoke City F.C. seasons
Stoke